The Cleveland US Bank Centre building is a high-rise located at 1350 Euclid Avenue in Cleveland, Ohio. Located in the heart of Cleveland's Theater District, the building was formerly known as Renaissance Center. It is the third tallest building in the district after the 1922-built 272 foot Keith Building and the 2020-built 396 foot apartment building, The Lumen.

It was built in 1990 by Architect Richard L Bowen Associates. Other companies that played a part in the building are: Grubb & Ellis Management Services, Inc. - Cleveland Branch, Granicor Inc., Forest City Erectors, Inc., Heritage Development Company, Turner Construction Company, and Duke Construction. The building has an attached parking garage with 444 spaces, Conference Facilities, a Restaurant, and Class A amenities. The building has 15 Floors and totals 210 feet. The tower maintains a popular legend that those on floors 12-15 after midnight see odd figures that resemble Cleveland pioneers from the nearby municipal graveyard. These floors have become popular on local ghost hunts and area legends.

Cleveland skyline placement

The outside building area was formerly known as Star Plaza, as it was a location of Cincinnati based Star Bank, which in turn changed its name to Firstar after an acquisition. Firstar later purchased U.S. Bank and kept the U.S. Bank name due to its national recognition.

See also
Downtown Cleveland
List of tallest buildings in Cleveland

References

Office buildings completed in 1990
Buildings and structures in Cleveland
Skyscraper office buildings in Cleveland